Rose McDermott is an American political scientist who is the David and Marianna Fisher University Professor of International Relations at Brown University. She has also taught at Cornell, UCSB, and Harvard. She is a member of the American Academy of Arts and Sciences and the recipient of numerous awards and fellowships. Her work is situated at the intersection of several disciplines including political science, psychology, biology, methods, development, and gender studies.

Early life and education 
McDermott was raised in Hawaii, United States. Her father was in the Navy. She has a B.A. in Political Science from Stanford University (1984), M.A. in Political Science from Columbia University (1986), M.A. in Experimental Social Psychology from Stanford University (1988), M.A. in Political Science from Stanford University (1990) and a PhD in Political Science from Stanford University (1991). 

At Columbia University, she was strongly influenced by Robert Jervis.

Research 
McDermott has applied prospect theory to U.S. foreign policy behavior.

In her publication, "Man is by nature a political animal: Evolution, Biology and Politics", she has focused on differentiating between conservatism and liberalism, rather than between democrats and republicans, and investigates how respectively conservatives and liberals experience the world differently. Before beginning the research it is recognized that your ideology is the result of processes of socialization and due to your environment, however this doesn't tell the whole story. The relative genetic importance is common in between cultures, however the relative influence from family and environment varies a lot depending on the society and the time.

A part of this research was carried out by having test persons look at different photos, and by eye tracking techniques, tracking what their eyes focused on. This could be related to their political ideology. An example would be that liberals tend to look at emotions - eyes, faces - compassion for a specific person or situation. Whereas conservatives would focus on authorities, a threat etc. The conclusion of this would be, that even though looking at the same photo, the persons would have different experiences of the same situation. 
This is interesting and relevant in regards to politics, because it's then possible to track the reaccion and therefore the difference in ideology, but also how different people experience different actions by governments, political actions etc. Furthermore, it shows that ideology has a greater personal impact, than just politics, but also actually defines certain characteristics and personal values.

Other researches carried out was by using human smell - having different test persons smell other people, and whether the ideology actually also had an impact here. They could conclude that liberals prefer the smell of liberals and conservatives prefer the smell of other conservatives, even though not knowing the ideology of the person they smelled.

An overall conclusion was that biology has a greater impact on politics than maybe expected. That politics not only has to do with the mindset or ideas about societal structures, but rather carved values, that define how you experience the world.

Publications 
 Bar-Joseph, Uri & McDermott, Rose (2017). Intelligence Successes and Failure: The Human Factor. New York: Oxford University Press.
 Hatemi, P. & McDermott, R.(Eds.) (2011). Man is by nature a political animal: Evolution, Biology and Politics. Chicago: University of Chicago Press.
 McDermott, R. (November, 2007). Presidential Leadership, Illness and Decision Making. New York: Cambridge University Press.
 Abdelal, R., Herrera, Y., Johnston, A.I. & McDermott, R. (Eds.) (2009). Measuring Identity: A Guide for Social Science Research. New York: Cambridge University Press.
 McDermott, R. (2004). Political Psychology in International Relations. Ann Arbor, MI: University of Michigan Press.
 McDermott, R. (1998). Risk-Taking in International Relations: Prospect Theory in Post-War American Foreign Policy. Ann Arbor, MI: University of Michigan Press.

Furthermore, more than 100 academic articles. To find CV please look at Brown University website: https://watson.brown.edu/people/faculty/mcdermott

References

External links
 TEDx talk
 

Living people
Brown University faculty
Cornell University faculty
University of California, Santa Barbara faculty
Harvard University faculty
Stanford University alumni
Columbia Graduate School of Arts and Sciences alumni
American women political scientists
American political scientists
Year of birth missing (living people)
American women academics
21st-century American women